Holt is a former village which has been incorporated into the municipality of the Town of East Gwillimbury, Ontario, Canada, formerly the Township of East Gwillimbury. The municipal offices of the town are located in Sharon.

The village is centred on the crossroads of Mt. Albert Rd and McCowan Rd. It is served by Highway 404 which is accessed via the Green Lane interchange.  Before 2001, the nearest interchange was several kilometres south at Davis Drive in Newmarket. An extension of the highway to points further north was opened in September 2014.

Surrounding communities
Queensville, north
Mount Albert, east
Newmarket south
Sharon, west

See also
 List of communities in Ontario

References

External links
Town of East Gwillimbury

Communities in the Regional Municipality of York